Joseph de Mesko, Freiherr von Felsö-Kubiny was a cavalry general and lieutenant-general in Habsburg service during the French Revolutionary and Napoleonic wars.

Military service 
In 1799, he fought as a Major in the Italian campaign during the War of the Second Coalition, in particular in the actions on the Po River. In September 1800, he was promoted to Lieutenant Colonel and in the next month to Colonel. The following year, Mesko was awarded the Knight's Cross of the Military Order of Maria Theresa.

In the war of Third Coalition (1805), he commanded a garrison in upper Styria. He was promoted to Major General. At the Battle of Raab, on 14 June, he was completely cut off, with 5,000 men and 10 guns, in the redoubts between the Rába and the Rabnitzbach rivers. In the following two days, he repelled repeated French attacks and even managed to take seven officers and 300 men as prisoner. On 16 June, he also freed a convoy of 36 Austrian officers and 500 men, when he ambushed their French captors at Kis-Szél. On 25 August 1809, he was awarded the Commander's Cross of the Military Order of Maria Theresa.

In 1813, as lieutenant-general, he commanded a division in General of Cavalry Johann von Klenau's IV Corps on the Army of Bohemia. At the Battle of Dresden, on 26 August, his division was cut off on the left wing when the river Weißeritz flooded. Attacked by Marie Victor de Fay, Marquis de Latour-Maubourg's cavalry corps, which, under Joachim Murat, forced him to surrender his division and 15 colors after a hard fight. A French participant observed, "Murat, who commanded this part of the French line, showed himself more brilliant than ever; for after forcing the defile of Cotta, he turned and cut off from the Austrian army Klenau's corps, hurling himself upon it at the head of the carabineers and cuirassiers. His movement was decisive; Klenau could not resist that terrible charge. Nearly all his battalions were compelled to lay down their arms, and two other divisions of infantry shared their fate." Mesko was severely wounded in the action and retired in September 1814. He died in Güns (Kőszeg), in Hungary, southwest of the Neusiedler See, on 29 August 1815.

Sources

Notes and Citations

Sources 
 Marbot, Jean-Baptiste Antoine Marcellin. The Memoirs of General Baron De Marbot, Volume II, Chapter 23. Electronic book widely available.

External Links (Sources) 
 Smith, Digby. Mesko Leopold Kudrna and Digby Smith (compilers). A biographical dictionary of all Austrian Generals in the French Revolutionary and Napoleonic Wars, 1792–1815. Napoleon Series, Robert Burnham, editor in chief. April 2008 version. Retrieved 8 December 2009.

1762 births
1815 deaths
18th-century Hungarian people
Hungarian soldiers
Austro-Hungarian Army officers
Hungarian generals
Austrian Empire military leaders of the French Revolutionary Wars
Austrian Empire commanders of the Napoleonic Wars
Hungarian nobility
People from Nógrád County
People from Kőszeg
18th-century Austrian military personnel
19th-century Austrian military personnel